A walking stick or walking cane is a device used primarily to aid walking, provide postural stability or support, or assist in maintaining a good posture. Some designs also serve as a fashion accessory, or are used for self-defense.

Walking sticks come in many shapes and sizes and some have become  collector's items. People with disabilities may use some kinds of walking sticks as a crutch but a walking cane is not designed for full weight support and is instead designed to help with balance. The walking stick has also historically been known to be used as a self defensive weapon and may conceal a knife or sword – as in a swordstick or swordcane.

Hikers use walking sticks, also known as trekking poles, pilgrim's staffs, hiking poles, or hiking sticks, for a wide variety of purposes: as a support when going uphill or as a brake when going downhill; as a balance point when crossing streams, swamps, or other rough terrain; to feel for obstacles in the path; to test mud and water for depth; to enhance the cadence of striding, and as a defence against animals. An alpenstock, from its origins in mountaineering in the Alps, is equipped with a steel point and may carry a hook or ice axe on top. More ornate sticks may be adorned with small trinkets or medallions depicting visited territory. Wooden walking-sticks are used for outdoor sports, healthy upper-body exercise, and even club, department, and family memorials. They can be individually handcrafted from a number of woods and may be personalised with wood carving or metal engraving plaques. 

A collector of walking sticks is termed a rabologist.

Origin

Around the 17th or 18th century, a walking stick took over from the shepherd's walking stick as an essential part of the European gentleman's wardrobe, used primarily as a walking stick. A walking stick also became a men's fashion and dress accessory which also helped to display one's social class level. It would be common for an individual to wear a custom hat and walking stick to distinguish their status and wealth. In addition to its value as a decorative accessory, it also continued to be a self defense item to protect the user from street crime. The standard cane was rattan with a rounded wooden handle.

Some canes had specially weighted metalwork. Other types of wood, such as hickory, are equally suitable.

Accessories
The most common accessory, before or after purchase or manufacture, is a hand strap, to prevent loss of the stick should the hand release its grip. These are often threaded through a hole drilled into the stick rather than tied around.
A clip-on frame or similar device can be used to stand a stick against the top of a table.
In cold climates, a metallic cleat may be added to the foot of the cane. This dramatically increases traction on ice. The device is usually designed so it can be easily flipped to the side to prevent damage to indoor flooring.
Different handles are available to match grips of varying sizes.
Rubber ferrules give extra traction on most surfaces.
Nordic walking (ski walking) poles are extremely popular in Europe. Walking with two poles in the correct length radically reduces the stress to the knees, hips and back. These special poles come with straps resembling a fingerless glove, durable metal tips for off-road and removable rubber tips for pavement and other hard surfaces.

Religious use

Various staffs of office derived from walking sticks or staffs are used by both western and eastern Christian churches.
In Islam the walking stick ('Asa) is considered a sunnah and Muslims are encouraged to carry one. The imam traditionally delivers the Khutbah while leaning on a stick.

Types

Ashplant 
an Irish walking stick made from the ash tree.

Blackthorn 
an Irish walking stick, or shillelagh, made from the blackthorn (Prunus spinosa).

Shooting stick 
It can fold out into a single-legged seat.

Supplejack 
Made from a tropical American vine, also serves as a cane.

Penang lawyer 
 Made from Licuala. After the bark was removed with only a piece of glass, the stick was straightened by fire and polished. The fictional Dr. Mortimer owned one of these in The Hound of the Baskervilles. So did Fitzroy Simpson, the main suspect in "The Adventure of Silver Blaze" (1892), whose lead weighted stick was initially assumed to be the murder weapon.

Makila (or makhila) 
Basque walking stick or staff, usually made from medlar wood. It often features a gold or silver foot and handle, which may conceal a steel blade. The Makila's elaborate engravings are actually carved into the living wood, then allowed to heal before harvesting.

Kebbie 
a rough Scottish walking stick, similar to an Irish shillelagh, with a hooked head.

Whangee 
Asian, made of bamboo, also a riding crop. Such a stick was owned by Charlie Chaplin's character The Tramp.

Malacca 
Malay stick made of rattan palms.

Pike Staff 
Pointed at the end for slippery surfaces.

Scout staff 
Tall stick traditionally carried by Boy Scouts, which has a number of uses in an emergency

Waddy 
Australian Aboriginal walking stick or war club, about one metre in length, sometimes with a stone head affixed with string and beeswax.

Ziegenhainer 
Knotty German stick, made from European cornel, also used as a melee weapon by a duellist's second. The spiral groove caused by a parasitic vine was often imitated by its maker if not present.

American "walking canes"

In North America, a walking cane is a walking stick with a curved top much like a shepherd's staff, but shorter. Thus, although they are called "canes", they are usually made of more modern material other than cane, such as wood, metal or carbon fiber.

In the United States, presidents have often carried canes and received them as gifts. The Smithsonian has a cane given to George Washington by Benjamin Franklin. It features a gold handle in the shape of a Phrygian cap. In modern times, walking sticks are usually only seen with formal attire. Retractable canes that reveal such properties as hidden compartments, pool sticks, or blades are popular among collectors. Handles have been made from many substances, both natural and manmade. Carved and decorated canes have turned the functional into the fantastic.

The idea of a fancy cane as a fashion accessory to go with top hat and tails has been popularized in many song-and-dance acts, especially by Fred Astaire in several of his films and songs such as Top Hat, White Tie and Tails and Puttin' On the Ritz, where he exhorts "Come, let's mix where Rockefellers walk with sticks or umbrellas in their mitts." He danced with a cane frequently.

Some canes, known as "tippling canes" or "tipplers", have hollowed-out compartments near the top where flasks or vials of alcohol could be hidden and sprung out on demand.

When used as a mobility or stability aid, canes are generally used in the hand opposite the injury or weakness. This may appear counter-intuitive, but this allows the cane to be used for stability in a way that lets the user shift much of their weight onto the cane and away from their weaker side as they walk. Personal preference, or a need to hold the cane in their dominant hand, means some cane users choose to hold the cane on their injured side.

In the U.S. Congress in 1856, Charles Sumner of Massachusetts criticized Stephen A. Douglas of Illinois and Andrew Butler of South Carolina for the Kansas–Nebraska Act. When a relative of Andrew Butler, Preston Brooks, heard of it, he felt that Sumner's behavior demanded retaliation, and beat him senseless on the floor of the Senate with a gutta-percha walking cane. Although this event is commonly known as "the caning of Senator Charles Sumner", it was not a caning in the normal (especially British) sense of formal corporal punishment with a much more flexible and usually thinner rattan.

See also

Cane gun
Cane holder
Canne de combat
Crutch
Nordic walking
Pace stick
Shillelagh (club)
Swordstick
Umbrella stand

References

External links

Walking-Stick Papers (Robert Cortes Holliday, 1918) – Project Gutenberg ebook
Walking Stick & Cane History Published with permission
Self-Defence with a Walking Stick (Pearson's Magazine, January 1901)

Fashion accessories
Tools
 
Stick